Northstar Commercial Partners is an American commercial real estate investment company headquartered in Denver, Colorado. Founded by Brian Watson in 2000, the company acquires distressed commercial real estate or vacant properties and rehabilitates them for lease or use.

History
Watson is a former manager and director at Cushman & Wakefield. In 2014, Northstar founded the Education Opportunity Fund, a $100 million real estate investment fund for identifying and restoring old retail or education buildings, which are then leased to charter schools. In addition, Northstar restores and leases other types of properties, such as warehouses, manufacturing centers, commercial offices, retail space, and senior care and medical facilities. In 2015, the firm launched Northstar Real Estate Opportunity Fund II, a $300 million private equity fund focused on institutional and private qualified or accredited investors.

Acquisitions
Northstar's current portfolio includes 42 assets totaling approximately 8 million square feet in 15 states and a potential market value of approximately $1.2 Billion.

See also
 Real estate
 Real estate trends
 Real estate appraisal 
 Real estate development

References

External links
 
 Brian Watson website

Real estate services companies of the United States
Real estate companies established in 2000
Companies based in Colorado
Companies based in Denver
2000 establishments in Colorado
2000 establishments in the United States